In enzymology, a serine-pyruvate transaminase is an enzyme that catalyzes the chemical reaction

L-serine + pyruvate  3-hydroxypyruvate + L-alanine

Thus, the two substrates of this enzyme are L-serine and pyruvate, whereas its two products are 3-hydroxypyruvate and L-alanine.

This enzyme belongs to the family of transferases, specifically the transaminases, which transfer nitrogenous groups.  The systematic name of this enzyme class is L-serine:pyruvate aminotransferase. Other names in common use include SPT, and hydroxypyruvate:L-alanine transaminase.  This enzyme participates in glycine, serine and threonine metabolism.  It employs one cofactor, pyridoxal phosphate.

Structural studies

As of late 2007, only one structure has been solved for this class of enzymes, with the PDB accession code .

References

 
 
 

EC 2.6.1
Pyridoxal phosphate enzymes
Enzymes of known structure